Alpha Phi Sigma (Phi is pronounced "fi") is the only Criminal Justice Honor Society accredited by the Association of College Honor Societies. Traditionally a national organization serving United States universities, recent expansion into Canadian universities has distinguished Alpha Phi Sigma as an international honor society. Established in January 1942 at Washington State University, Alpha Phi Sigma recognizes academic excellence of undergraduate and graduate students of criminal justice, as well as those seeking a Juris Doctor degree. Presently, its national headquarters is located at Nova Southeastern University in Fort Lauderdale, Florida. The society's newsletter is called 'The Docket'. 

Alpha Phi Sigma was admitted into the Association of Collegiate Honor Societies (ACHS) in 1980.

Student Membership Requirements 
There are several requirements for becoming a member of Alpha Phi Sigma.

Undergraduate students shall be enrolled at the time of application in the institution represented by the chapter, have
declared a major, minor or equivalent in the criminal justice or related field, have completed three full-time semesters
or its equivalent, have a minimum GPA of 3.2 on a 4.0 scale, with a minimum GPA of 3.2 in courses in criminal
justice related fields and rank in the top 35% of their class. A minimum of four courses of the above course work shall
be in the criminal justice field.

Masters students shall be enrolled at the time of application in a Master's program in the Criminal Justice field in
the institution represented by the chapter; have completed four courses, have a minimum GPA of 3.4 on a 4.0 scale.
Up to three undergraduate courses in Criminal Justice may be used to satisfy the four-course requirement. These
courses must equate to a 3.4 GPA or higher, and the cumulative undergraduate degree program GPA is a 3.2 or
higher. In addition, all Masters level coursework must equate to a 3.4 GPA or higher at the institution in which the
student is enrolled.

Doctoral Students shall be enrolled at the time of application in a Ph.D. program in the Criminal Justice/ related
field in the institution represented by the chapter; have completed four courses, have a minimum GPA of 3.6 on a
4.0 scale. Up to three Masters courses in Criminal Justice may be used to satisfy the four-course requirement. These
courses must equate to a 3.6 GPA or higher, and the cumulative master's degree program GPA is a 3.4 or higher. In
addition, any Ph.D. level coursework must equate to a 3.6 GPA or higher at the institution in which the student is
enrolled.

Law School Students must have completed their first academic semester, with a grade point average of 2.5
or higher, on a 4.0 scale.

Individual chapters may apply more stringent standards if they so desire.

Chapters

Notes

See also 
 Order of the Coif (honor society, law)
 The Order of Barristers (honor society, law; litigation)
 Phi Delta Phi (honor society, law; was a professional fraternity)
 Lambda Epsilon Chi (honor society, paralegal)

 Delta Theta Phi (professional fraternity, law)
 Gamma Eta Gamma (professional fraternity, law)
 Phi Alpha Delta (professional fraternity, law)
 Phi Beta Gamma (professional fraternity, law)
 Phi Delta Delta (professional fraternity, women, law)
 Sigma Delta Kappa (professional fraternity, law)
 Kappa Alpha Pi (professional) (professional fraternity, pre-law)

 Kappa Beta Pi (originally women's professional fraternity, now legal association, law)
 Nu Beta Epsilon (Jewish, originally men's professional fraternity, law, dormant?)

External links
 Alpha Phi Sigma official website
 Alpha Phi Sigma at Association of College Honor Societies



Association of College Honor Societies
Student organizations established in 1942
1942 establishments in Washington (state)